Kosjeríć is a town and municipality located in the Zlatibor District of western Serbia. The municipality has a population of 12,090 inhabitants, but the town itself has 3,992.

Geography
The town is situated on the road between Požega on one end and Valjevo on the other. The town is near the mountain tourist centres: Divčibare and Zlatibor. It lies at the foothill of Drmanovina and Crnokosa and from south Povlen and Maljen mountains.

Climate
Kosjerić has a humid continental climate (Köppen climate classification: Dfb), that's very close to an oceanic climate (Köppen climate classification: Cfb).

History
The exact date of the town's founding is unclear. Near the town archaeologists have found Roman and Serbian medieval relics, but it is believed that mass immigration occurred before the Serbian Revolution at the beginning of the nineteenth century with people from Montenegro, East Bosnia and the Western Serbian mountains Zlatibor and Tara.

This part of Serbia was under the rule of the Nemanjić dynasty until the Ottoman Empire seized control of the country in 1463. During the next two centuries roads were built and major development began linking the Adriatic Sea to western Serbia and to the east. Wars between Austria-Hungary and the Turks took a toll on the population numbers in Kosjerić.

It is thought that the oldest inhabitants of the town were from the family Kosijer. From legends it is said that Antonije Kosjer came from Kosijer in Montenegro and brought his three sons along with him. After that Jovan Baronim came from the village Bare and his sister accompanied him with seven sons. It is recorded that there was migration from the village of Divci and from Montenegrin Kolašin.

Rapid development began in 1882, but it was suppressed by the faster-growing communities of nearby bigger towns, Valjevo and Požega. Kosjerić reached the status of the town in 1966 and economic development after the completion of the Belgrade-Bar railway in 1972.

Demographics

According to the 2011 census results, the municipality of Kosjerić has a population of 12,090 inhabitants.

Ethnic groups
Ethnic composition of the municipality:

Settlements
Aside from the town of Kosjerić, the municipality includes the following 27 settlements:

 Bjeloperica
 Brajkovići
 Varda
 Galovići
 Godečevo
 Godljevo
 Gornja Pološnica
 Donja Pološnica
 Drenovci
 Dubnica
 Makovište
 Mionica
 Mrčići
 Mušići
 Paramun
 Radanovci
 Rosići
 Ruda Bukva
 Seča Reka
 Skakavci
 Stojići
 Subjel
 Tubići
 Cikote
 Ševrljuge

Economy
Much of Kosjeríć's economy is based on agriculture and processing industry, with local cement factory being the key of economic development in past few decades. The cement factory is one of three Serbian cement factories and it has helped boost the economic prosperity not only for the town but for the whole region. In 2002, TITAN Group and the Serbian Privatization Agency signed an agreement for the transfer of 70% of the share capital of the Kosjerić Cement company, a deal worth $35.5 million. As of 2013, the production capacity of the Kosjerić cement plant was 750,000 tons. With modernization of production processes, the number of employees fell from 680 in 2002 to around 250 in 2013. Many of the town citizens are employed at the factory.

Due to its location and climate Kosjerić has a strong production of fruit and vegetables, most of which are plums and raspberries. The area is well known for its plum brandy (40–45% ABV; "ljuta rakija"). Other successful companies are: concrete pipelines manufacturer "Pim-Grad", electric equipment manufacturer "Elkok" and factories for the manufacture of concrete elements like "Kofeniks" and "Povlen".

The following table gives a preview of total number of registered people employed in legal entities per their core activity (as of 2018):

Tourism
Kosjerić has developing tourism industry. Kosjerić and the surrounding area are known for their fresh air and beautiful nature. High mountains, fields, wood and water wells surround the town and it is famous for country tourism and the production of healthy food.

It has attracted many people from central Serbia for its famed festivals: "The Shepard Days" which is held every July and "Days of Petar Lazić" which is held every August. Also, every year an NGO called "K-Town Group" organize an international art camp "Kosjerić", which includes different art workshops with 50 participants from around the world. The development and reconstruction of the "Hotel Olympic" has also further helped increase tourist numbers.

Gallery

Twin cities
  Slovenske Konjice, Slovenia

References

External links 

 Official municipality presentation
 Kosjerić Citizens Community

 
Populated places in Zlatibor District
Municipalities and cities of Šumadija and Western Serbia